Cucurucho is a local delicacy of the city of Baracoa in eastern Cuba. Wrapped in a cone-shaped palm leaf (hence the name: cucurucho - Spanish for cone or cornet), it is a mix of coconut, sugar and other ingredients such as orange, guava and pineapple.

See also
Cuban cuisine

References

Cuban cuisine
Desserts